Section 52 of the Constitution Act, 1867 is a provision of the Constitution of Canada which gives the federal Parliament the power to increase the number of members in the House of Commons, provided any increase respects the principle of proportionate provincial representation in the House of Commons.

The Constitution Act, 1867 is the constitutional statute which established Canada.  Originally named the British North America Act, 1867, the Act continues to be the foundational statute for the Constitution of Canada, although it has been amended many times since 1867.  It is now recognised as part of the supreme law of Canada.

Constitution Act, 1867

The Constitution Act, 1867 is part of the Constitution of Canada and thus part of the supreme law of Canada.  It was the product of extensive negotiations by the governments of the British North American provinces in the 1860s. The Act sets out the constitutional framework of Canada, including the structure of the  federal government and the powers of the federal government and the provinces.  Originally enacted in 1867 by the British Parliament under the name the British North America Act, 1867, in 1982 the Act was brought under full Canadian control through the Patriation of the Constitution, and was renamed the Constitution Act, 1867.  Since Patriation the Act can only be amended in Canada, under the amending formula set out in the Constitution Act, 1982.

Text of section 52 

Section 52 reads:

Section 52 is found in Part IV of the Constitution Act, 1867, dealing with the legislative powers of the federal government.  It has not been amended since the Act was enacted in 1867.

Purpose and interpretation
One of the driving forces towards Confederation in the Province of Canada was that the two divisions, Canada East (now Quebec) and Canada West (now Ontario), had equal representation in the Parliament of the Province of Canada, regardless of population shifts.  By the early 1860s, Canada West had a significantly higher population than Canada East, but each section had the same political strength.  This arrangement led to considerable political instability.

George Brown, a leader of the Reformers of Canada West and ultimately a Father of Confederation, campaigned strongly for "representation by population", namely that the representation of each section in the provincial Parliament would be tied to population.  However, so long as the provincial Parliament had full jurisdiction over both sections of the Province, this option was not acceptable to French Canadians in Canada East.  They feared that they would be overwhelmed by policies favouring English-Canadians, who would have an overall majority under rep-by-pop.  This political problem was one of the factors which led the politicians in the Province of Canada to consider types of federalism, either a broad federation of all of the eastern British North American provinces, or a more limited federation of Canada East and Canada West within the Province of Canada.

Section 52 of the Act implements this principle of representation by population.  The federal Parliament is given the power to increase the total number of seats in the House of Commons, provided the increased number of seats are distributed according to the principle of proportionate representation, set out in section 51 of the Act.

The proportionate representation in the House of Commons is considered a fundamental principle of the structure of the federal system and cannot be changed unilaterally by the federal Parliament.  It can only be changed by a constitutional amendment consented to by the two houses of the federal Parliament, and the legislative assemblies of at least two-thirds of the provinces, having at least fifty per cent of the population of the provinces.  This requirement is set out in the constitutional amendment provisions of the Constitution Act, 1982.

Related provisions
Sections 38(1) and 42(1)(a) of the Constitution Act, 1982 define the process for amending the requirement for proportionate provincial representation in the House of Commons.

References 

Constitution of Canada
Canadian Confederation
Federalism in Canada